Brand New Eyes World Tour was a series of concert tours by the American rock band Paramore, touring North America, Europe, Asia, Japan, Australia, United Kingdom, South America, New Zealand and other countries.

Tour
Paramore announced their U.S. tour for Brand New Eyes on their official site, with The Swellers and Paper Route joining them as opening acts. The first show of the tour was played at a packed Fox Theater in Pomona, California, on September 29, 2009 (the day of the album's release). During "Decode", Williams lost her voice and the two remaining songs in the setlist were played instrumentally. The tour, which previously went from September 29, 2009, to November 1, 2009, was later officially postponed on October 2, 2009, due to a case of laryngitis for singer Hayley Williams. The full tour resumed on October 10, 2009, in Chicago.

The band also announced that they would be doing a European tour starting off in Helsinki, Finland, on November 29, 2009, with You Me at Six, Paper Route, and Now, Now Every Children supporting all UK tour dates.

They performed in February 2010 in the Australian Soundwave Festival, along with bands such as You Me at Six, Taking Back Sunday, All Time Low and Alexisonfire. They performed at the Soundwave Festival before they did the Brand New Eyes Tour in Australia. Then in the first week of march they performed two concerts in New Zealand. One to a sell out crowd of 5000 in Auckland and the other in Christchurch.

Paramore will support Green Day on their tour. They will open the concerts of Green Day in Dublin, Ireland (June 23, 2010) and in Paris, France (June 26, 2010).

In July, August and September 2010, the band announced a tour in the Honda Civic Tour 2010.

In May 2010, the band announced a short UK tour for November 2010.

In June 2010, the band announced a short Australia Tour for October.

In November 2010, the band announced a short in South American Tour for February and March, and the band announced a short American tour for December.

They have stated that after their South American tour, the band will take a break to write for their next album.

Honda Civic Tour Show
The Honda Civic tour was the biggest production the band had had so far. The stage was constructed of 3 ramps up to a platform behind the drum set, and 6 large video screens behind that. The show began with a large black curtain concealing the stage while the band played an instrumental intro, with spotlights revealing the silhouettes of the band. As the intro ended, they begin playing "Ignorance" as the curtain simultaneously dropped, the video screens flashing the band's logo during the intro, as the intro progressed the video screen changed to images of light bulbs (similar to the song's music video) during the intro, light bulbs also swung down from the top of the stage, continuing to swing throughout the song. The band then played "Feeling Sorry" as the video screens each showed a live feed of each member of the band performing during the choruses, at the end of the bridge the band would stop playing and Hayley would greet the crowd and welcome them to the tour. After playing "That's What You Get" and "Emergency" the band played "Playing God" as the video screens showed images of picture frames, the same picture frames on the back of Brand New Eyes and the song's single cover. After that they played Careful, as images of the Brand New Eyes butterfly flashed during the chorus, they then continued with their hit-single "Decode" as the video screen showed the band running through the forest with fireworks and flares, the video has been described as a part-two to the song's music video. After that Hayley Williams and Josh Farro moved to stage left and performed an acoustic cover of Loretta Lynn's "You Ain't Women Enough." After that, a red couch (similar to the one on the cover of All We Know is Falling) and a small lamp were brought out and the band performed a three-song acoustic set, during this the light bulbs from Ignorance were brought down again to illuminate the stage. After that the band returned with "Let the Flames Begin" while the video screens showed images of open hands during the 'Oh Father' outro. They then performed "Crushcrushcrush" and "Pressure " stopping in the bridge during "Pressure" for Hayley to introduce all the band members, and for Josh to introduce Hayley. They then performed "Looking Up" while each of the video screens showed lyrics to the song and each of the band members daily lives, at the end of the song all the members came together to ride bikes as the split-screens faded away. They then ended their main set with their biggest hit "The Only Exception" as pyrotechnics were used during the last chorus of the song. The band then exited and come back for an encore, starting with "Brick By Boring Brick" while the video screens showed various images, including deserts, snakes, the Brand New Eyes butterfly, and hot air balloons. After "Brick" the band concluded their set with their breakthrough song "Misery Business" as flashing images of the "Riot!" logo filled the video screens, during the bridge Williams would let one, or sometimes various fans on stage to sing the rest of the song or sometimes play guitar, and as the last chorus came in confetti cannons were shot towards the crowd. The set concluded with the video screen showing Paramore's logo and the band bowing then leaving the stage. They used the same production for their Oceania and UK tours.

2009 Paramore Tours

Fall Tour

Opening acts
Paper Route
The Swellers (North America)
You Me at Six (Europe)
Now Now Every Children (Europe)
AFI (Ulalume Festival at Merriweather Post Pavilion)
Dead by Sunrise (Ulalume Festival at Merriweather Post Pavilion)
Kid Cudi (Ulalume Festival at Merriweather Post Pavilion)

Setlist

Tour dates
	

a This concert is a part of the mtvU Ulalume Festival

2010 Paramore Tours

Pacific Run

Opening acts
You Me at Six (Australia)

Setlist

Tour dates

b This concert is a part of the Soundwave Festival

The Spring Tour

Opening acts
Relient K
fun.

Setlist

Tour dates

c  This concert is a part of the Disney Grad Nite
d  This concert is a part of the Radio 1's Big Weekend
e  This concert is a part of the KROQ Weenie Roast

European Festival & Concert Tour

Opening Acts
The Blackout (Belfast)

Setlist

Tour dates

f This concert is a part of supporting Green Day on their 21st Century Breakdown World Tour

Honda Civic Tour

Opening acts
Tegan and Sara
New Found Glory
Kadawatha
Relient K (select dates only)

Setlist

Tour dates

g This concert is part of the Reading and Leeds Festivals weekend

Oceania and Asia Tour

Opening acts
Relient K
Jury and the Saints
Yes2Kapitalism (Asia)

Setlist

Tour dates

United Kingdom & Ireland Fall Tour

Opening acts
B.o.B (UK – England, Ireland)
All Forgotten (UK – Scotland)
fun.
Scuba Dice (Dublin)

Setlist

Tour dates

USO

Holiday Shows

Setlist

Tour dates

h 107.9 The End Jingle Ball
i 106.1 Kiss FM Jingle Bell Bash 
j 102.7 KIIS FM Jingle Ball
k Z100 Jingle Ball
l XL1067 XL'ent Xmas

2011 Paramore Tours

South American Tour

Opening acts
Locomotor (Peru)
El sin sentido (Colombia)
Cambio de Habito (Venezuela)
Outono '09 (Brasília)
Alecto or Hey Ladies (Belo Horizonte)
Fake Number (Rio de Janeiro and São Paulo)
Doyoulike (Porto Alegre)
Libra (Chile)
Cirse (Argentina)
I Am the Avalanche (Puerto Rico)

Setlist

Tour dates

MusiCares

Setlist

Tour dates

European Summer Tour

Setlist

Tour dates

m This concert is a part of the Rock In Summer Festival
n This concert is a part of the U18 Festival

The Vans Warped Tour

Setlist

Tour dates

Asia Tour

Opening acts
The Swellers

Setlist

Tour dates

U.S. Final Shows

Setlist

Tour dates

o This concert is a part of the Fueled By Ramen 15th Anniversary Show

2012 Paramore Tours

Setlist

p This concert is a part of the Belsonic festival

References

External links

2009 concert tours
2010 concert tours
2011 concert tours
2012 concert tours
Paramore concert tours